Santa Maria Hoè is a comune (municipality) in the Province of Lecco in the Italian region Lombardy, located about  northeast of Milan and about  south of Lecco.

Santa Maria Hoè borders the following municipalities: Castello di Brianza, Colle Brianza, Olgiate Molgora, Rovagnate.

Demographic evolution

References

Cities and towns in Lombardy